Sint-Joris is a village in the municipality of Beernem, in the province of West Flanders, Belgium.

Populated places in West Flanders
Beernem